Woodstock (Norm Beckham/Bob Hewitt Field) Aerodrome  is located  west of Woodstock, Ontario, Canada. The registered aerodrome is home to the Woodstock Ontario Flying Club.

Field 

The airstrip is a  grass strip with  overrun areas and a gravel filings centre line. The gravel is nearly grown in with grass. The airfield is at an altitude of  AMSL.

History

The Flying Club and airfield was established on June 20, 1968. The founders included Robert Hewitt and Norman Beckham, after whom the airport is named.

Events 

The WOFC annually holds a large garage sale on one weekend in August.

References

Registered aerodromes in Ontario
Transport in Woodstock, Ontario
Buildings and structures in Oxford County, Ontario